Milan Cheylov is a Canadian television director/producer. A professional stage actor at 15, Cheylov ran Bootleg Theatre in Toronto for ten years. He acted in theatre, television and film for almost twenty years. He started producing and directing short films and television shows in his mid-twenties. Cheylov moved to LA in 2006 to direct the Emmy-Award-winning action drama "24" (where he also became a producer), among many others. He has directed over 150 episodes of television, from drama ("24", "Dexter", "Agents of Shield", "Once Upon A Time", "Prison Break") to comedy ("Rosewood", "Las Vegas", "Chuck", "The Chris Isaak Show"). He was Co-Executive producer on Fox TV's "Rosewood", and most recently was Co-Executive Producer on ABC's "Station 19". Cheylov is married to NY Times-bestselling author Lori Lansens ("The Girls", "Rush Home Road", "The Mountain Story", upcoming "This Little Light"). They have two children and live in Los Angeles.

As a director, some of his television credits include:
 Street Legal
 Flash Forward
 The Famous Jett Jackson
 PSI Factor: Chronicles of the Paranormal 
 Earth: Final Conflict
 Relic Hunter
 Monk
 The Chris Isaak Show
 The 4400
 Las Vegas
 Agents of S.H.I.E.L.D.
 Prison Break
 24 (also supervising producer)
 Bones
 Person of Interest
 The Finder
 Once Upon a Time
 The Event
 Dexter
 Rizzoli & Isles
 Wisdom of the Crowd
 Station 19
 Deputy
 The Cleaning Lady
 FBI: International

As an actor, he had a regular role on the television series The Edison Twins as well as guest starring on the shows The Twilight Zone, Night Heat, Diamonds and doing voice work on Star Wars: Droids.

References

External links

Living people
Canadian people of Russian descent
Place of birth missing (living people)
Year of birth missing (living people)
Canadian expatriates in the United States
Canadian male film actors
Canadian film editors
Canadian film producers
Canadian male television actors
Canadian television directors
Canadian television producers
Canadian male voice actors